Muckross Lake, also called Middle Lake or The Torc, is a lake in Killarney National Park, County Kerry, Ireland. It is one of the three famous Lakes of Killarney, along with Lough Leane and Upper Lake.

Wildlife

The lake is a noted salmon and brown trout fishery.

It is also a habitat for the critically endangered blunt-snouted Irish char (Salvelinus obtusus).

The monster

As with many lakes, Muckross Lake allegedly contains a monster.

See also 
 List of loughs in Ireland

References 

Lakes of County Kerry
Killarney